This is a list containing the Billboard Hot Latin Tracks number-ones of 2004.

See also
Hot Latin Tracks

References

United States Latin Tracks
2004
2004 in Latin music